Mother Teresa: Saint or Celebrity? is a 2007 non-fiction book written by Gëzim Alpion about Mother Teresa.

Background
According to Stephen Schwartz, Gëzim Alpion is "a pioneer in the academic study of the phenomenon of celebrity", and "the most authoritative English-language author on Blessed Teresa of Kolkata".

Alpion's first study on Mother Teresa "Media, ethnicity and patriotism: The Balkans ‘unholy war’ for the appropriation of Mother Teresa", was published in the Journal of Southern Europe and the Balkans (now Journal of Balkan and Near Eastern Studies), in 2004. This was followed by the article "Media and celebrity culture: subjectivist, structuralist and post-structuralist approaches to Mother Teresa’s celebrity status", which was published in Continuum: Journal of Media & Cultural Studies in 2006.

Overview 

In Mother Teresa: Saint or Celebrity?, Gëzim Alpion explored the significance of Mother Teresa to the mass media, to celebrity culture, to the Church, and to various political and national groups. Drawing on new research on Mother Teresa's early years, Alpion charted her rise to fame, investigating the celebrity discourse in which a nun was turned into a media and humanitarian icon. The book talks about the cultural and critical analysis of Mother Teresa and the way she and others created, promoted, and censored her public image in the context of the sociology of fame, media, religion, and nationality. One section explores the ways different vested interests sought to appropriate the nun after her death, and also examines Mother Teresa's own attitude to her childhood and to the Balkan conflicts in the 1980s and 1990s.

Referring to Mother Teresa: Saint or Celebrity?, Stephen Schwartz holds that "in its depth, breadth, and seriousness", this monograph "may stand for some time to come as the single most important biography of Mother Teresa in English". In his review of the book which appeared in the American Communication Journal, Marvin Williams contends that

References

External links 
Alpion, Gëzim. 'Oh! not Calcutta' The Guardian, 6 September 2003.
Arnot, Chris. 'Sinners and winners'. The Guardian, 1 November 2005.
Lipsett, Anthea. 'Gëzim Alpion: Speaking for the refugee in us all'. Times Higher Education, 3 February 2006.
Spink, Kathryn. 'Baffled by enigma of sancity'. The Tablet, 6 January 2007.
Derbyshire, Stuart. 'Mother Teresa and the ‘me, me, me’ culture'. Spiked Magazine, 14 February 2007.
Neuhaus, Richard John. 'T. S. Eliot, Mother Teresa, and the Children of Darkness'. First Things: The Journal of Religion, Culture and Public Life, New York, 23 February 2007.
Liaugminas, Sheila. 'Trashing the icon of altruism'. MercatorNet, 27 February 2007.
Byrne, Lavinia. 'Famous by her own design'. Church Times, London, 3 April 2007.
Schwartz, Stephen 'Review of Mother Teresa: Saint or Celebrity?'. Illyria, New York, 19 September 2007.
Alpion, Gëzim. 'Understanding Mother Teresa’s Vocation and Migration'. Migrant Woman magazine, London, 27 September 2014.

Routledge books
English non-fiction books
2007 non-fiction books
Mother Teresa